The 1960/61 NTFL season was the 40th season of the Northern Territory Football League (NTFL).

Nightcliff have won there 2nd premiership title while defeating St Marys in the grand final by 14 points.

Grand Final

References 

Northern Territory Football League seasons
NTFL